Nowy Gostków  is a village in the administrative district of Gmina Wartkowice, within Poddębice County, Łódź Voivodeship, in central Poland.

References

Villages in Poddębice County